The Renclusa refuge (Spanish: Refugio de la Renclusa) is a refuge located in the Spanish Pyrenees at the foot of the massif de la Maladeta, at  high, in the Ésera valley. It is the starting point for excursions to the summit of la Maladeta, of the monts Maudits and the Aneto (highest point in the Pyrenees). It lies in the commune of Benasque, north-east of Huesca province, Aragon (Spain).

History 

It was originally a shelter under rock, then a shepherd's hut, which was used as a shelter by Platon de Tchihatchev, Albert de Franqueville and guides Pierre Sanio, Jean Sors dit Argarot, Pierre Redonnet dit Nate et Bernard Arrazau dit Ursule, during their first ascension of the Aneto in July 1842.

Later, engineer and Catalan pyreneist Juli Soler i Santaló (1865-1914) made a small 4x3 house built, near its current location, which he named villa Maladeta, and he draughted the future refuge.

The refuge was inaugurated in 1916. It had 22 beds and was kept by Antonio Abadias. It rapidly became one of the most frequented refuges in the Pyrenees. The Spanish civil war interrupted its activity, and it wasn't until 1951 that a new refuge, restored and enlarged, came to be. After Antonio Abadias' death, Benasquan Antonio Garié succeeded him in 1966.

Access and services 

Today the refuge offers around 110 places and is one of the biggest in the Pyrenees. It is kept from end of June to end of September and is open weekends during the skiing period. It is managed by the Aragonese Mountain Federation (FAM) and the Excursionist Centre of Catalonia (CEC). One can get there from Benasque (about an hour's walk from Besurta car park) and from France, from Bagnères-de-Luchon, by the port de Venasque.

References

External links 

 Federacion aragonesa de montanismo

Geography of Spain
Mountain huts in Spain